Pantarchy is a social theory proposed by Stephen Pearl Andrews in the 19th century. Andrews was considered the "American rival of Comte," because of his work on an all-encompassing philosophy of universology, and his political proposals had similar scope, combining elements of the individualist anarchism of Josiah Warren, whose works Andrews had edited, with a strong belief in natural hierarchy.

The plan of this party proposes a NEW SPIRITUAL GOVERNMENT FOR THE WORLD, called THE PANTARCHY, which includes a NEW CHURCH and a NEW STATE, with, to use his own language, " all other subordinate institutions, educational, informational, &c., which are universal in their scope and nature, and which can be devised and established as subservient to the collective wants of mankind."

Andrews scheme of pantarchy was discussed in a series of "Weekly Bulletins" in the pages of Woodhull and Claflin's Weekly. The American Section 12 of the International Workingmen's Association adopted some of Andrews' proposals.

See also
 Stephen Pearl Andrews
 Victoria Woodhull
 Anarchism

References

Theocracy